, is one of the Tokara Islands, a sub-group of the Satsunan Islands belonging to Kagoshima Prefecture, Japan. The island, 7.42 km² in area, has a population of 59 persons. The island can only be reached by boat as it has no airport; there is a ferry service twice per week to the city of Kagoshima on the mainland. Travel time is about 11 hours. The islanders are dependent mainly on fishing and seasonal tourism.

Geography

, the highest elevation on the island, is a lava dome. Lava flows in the northern portion of the island have been dated to 80,000 years ago. There has been no volcanic activity in historic times.

Its climate is classified as subtropical, with a rainy season from May through September.

History
Until 1624, the island was part of the Ryukyu Kingdom. During the Edo period, Takarajima was part of Satsuma Domain and was administered as part of Kawabe District. In 1896, the island was transferred to the administrative control of Ōshima District, Kagoshima, and from 1911 was part of the village of Toshima, Kagoshima. From 1946-1952, the island was administered by the United States as part of the Provisional Government of Northern Ryukyu Islands.

Annual commemorations are held on the island and there is also a memorial museum.

Akusekijima drew attention during the Solar eclipse of July 22, 2009, which was the longest total solar eclipse of the twenty-first century, as the island was one of the closest inhabited areas to the location of maximum eclipse duration. Touted as was one of the best observation spots for the event, village officials and island residents were concerned about playing host to hundreds of people coming to view the solar eclipse. Akusekijima only has five small minshuku guesthouses, which can only accommodate up to 66 people, and water resources are limited as rainfall is the primary source of water.

Culture
Akusekijima is also famous for the masked god , the island deity. Islanders donning Boze masks come out during the annual lunar O-Bon matsuri. Protectors of the island and its natural assets, the Boze frighten small children to ensure their safety for the coming year.

See also
List of islands in Japan
List of volcanoes in Japan

References
National Geospatial Intelligence Agency (NGIA). Prostar Sailing Directions 2005 Japan Enroute. Prostar Publications (2005).

External links

 Akusekijima - Toshima Village Official Website
 Akuseki Jima - Geological Survey of Japan
 

Tokara Islands
Stratovolcanoes of Japan
Islands of Kagoshima Prefecture
Volcanoes of Kagoshima Prefecture